The 2012–13 Korfball Europa Cup was the main korfball competition for clubs in Europe played in the season 2012-2013.

First round
The first round took place in the weekend of 14–16 September 2012 in Montrond-les-Bains (France).

Final round
The final round was held in Budapest, Hungary from 16 to 19 January 2013. With the seeded champions of Netherlands, Belgium, Portugal, Czech Republic, Russia, England, Germany, Catalonia, Poland and host country Hungary, as well as the 2 best teams in the first round.

 Qualified teams 

   Koog Zaandijk
   Boeckenberg
   Benfica
   Ceské Budejovice
   Orel
   Trojans
   Schweriner KC
   CEVG
   Szentendre KK
   Megasports Warszawa
   Bonson
   Beograd

Competition

Final standings

References

External links
Europa Cup 2013 - First round (IKF)
Europa Cup 2013 - Final round (IKF)

Korfball European Cup
Korfball Europa Cup
Korfball Europa Cup